Michael Gordon Clifford (born 20 November 1995) is an Australian musician, best known as the lead guitarist of the pop rock band 5 Seconds of Summer. Since 2014, 5 Seconds of Summer have sold more than 10 million albums, sold over 2 million concert tickets worldwide, and the band's song streams surpass 7 billion, making them one of the most successful Australian musical exports in history.

Early life 

Michael Gordon Clifford was born on 20 November 1995 and raised in the Quakers Hill suburb of Sydney, New South Wales.  He is the only child of parents Karen and Daryl Clifford, who ran a computer business based outside of Sydney. Clifford attended Norwest Primary school where he befriended future band-mate Calum Hood in the third grade. For his high-school education, Clifford attended Norwest Christian college where he met band-mate, Luke Hemmings in Year 7. He later revealed that he initially "hated" Hemmings for "a solid year" before becoming friends and forming the band. Clifford met future band-mate Ashton Irwin through mutual friends in Year 9. Admitting in a People magazine interview that he "spent a lot of time away from school", Clifford's irregular attendance eventually resulted in him leaving high-school entirely when he was in Year 10 and instead, completing a course at TAFE.

Clifford first learned how to play guitar from the video game Guitar Hero when he was eight years old. Growing up, Clifford took both singing lessons and piano lessons before quitting because he "hated" them. At the age of eleven, his parents bought him an acoustic guitar and Clifford began taking guitar lessons. In high-school, Clifford joined his school's church band to play the instrument.

Career 

In 2011, Clifford, Hood and Hemmings began posting song covers on Hemmings' YouTube channel. The trio eventually added mutual friend Ashton Irwin to their videos, forming the current 5 Seconds of Summer lineup.  After months of posting song covers together, the band began attracting interest from major music labels and publishers and initially signed a publishing deal with Sony/ATV Music Publishing. Clifford has since released five studio albums with the band, each met with worldwide success: 5 Seconds of Summer (2014), Sounds Good Feels Good (2015), Youngblood (2018), Calm (2020) and 5SOS5 (2022).

At the NAMM Show in January 2019, Clifford, in collaboration with Gibson, revealed the Michael Clifford Signature Melody Maker guitar. The guitar was released for purchase in May 2019, with Clifford citing his main inspiration for the guitar being his own first guitar, Joan Jett's Melody Maker. He stated that the goal of his Melody Maker was to "be an homage to the Joan Jett Melody Maker" and that he hoped the guitar would "inspire" someone, just as Jett inspired him. Clifford is the youngest guitarist to ever receive a custom guitar in his name.

In June 2019, it was revealed Clifford had partnered with Nightfood Ice Cream in developing a custom chocolate flavor for the brand.

Apart from the band, Clifford has expressed interest in gaming. His Twitch account, which he uses to live-stream game sessions, has amassed over 150,000 followers. During the Australian Bushfires in January 2020, Clifford held a charity Twitch live-stream, in which all proceeds were donated to Australian Red Cross.

Personal life 
Clifford has been diagnosed with anxiety and depression. Since the beginning of his career, Clifford has used his platform to raise awareness and be an advocate for mental health. In June 2015, Clifford suffered minor face, hair, and shoulder injuries from a pyrotechnics accident during the band's Rock Out With Your Socks Out Tour at the SSE Wembley Arena in London.

In January 2019, Clifford posted on his Instagram account announcing his engagement to his girlfriend of three years, Crystal Leigh Lauderdale. On 11 January 2022, the couple announced their one-year anniversary, saying that they had wedded a year before in a secret ceremony.

In 2019, it was reported that Clifford bought an eight-bedroom, 4-acre mansion in Los Angeles' Valley Village neighborhood located in San Fernando Valley. As of 2020, Clifford's net worth is estimated to be US$25 million.

Discography

Songwriting credits

References

External links 

1995 births
Living people
Australian rock guitarists
Australian male singer-songwriters
Lead guitarists
Musicians from Sydney
Twitch (service) streamers